Harry Matthews may refer to:

Harry Grindell Matthews (1880–1941), English inventor
Harry Matthews (boxer) (1922–2003), American boxer

See also
Harry Mathews (1930–2017), American author and poet
Harry Mathews (baseball) (1876 – after 1929), baseball coach
Harry Matthew (1870–1956), Scottish footballer
Harold Matthews (disambiguation)
Henry Matthews (disambiguation)
Matthews (surname)